Feda is a former municipality in the old Vest-Agder county, Norway. The  municipality existed from 1900 until its dissolution in 1963. The administrative centre was the village of Feda where the Feda Church is located. Feda encompassed the far southern tip of the present-day municipality of Kvinesdal in what is now Agder county.

History
The municipality of Feda was created on 1 January 1900 when the old municipality of Kvinesdal was split into two separate municipalities: Feda (population: 1,090) and Liknes (population: 2,937). During the 1960s, there were many municipal mergers across Norway due to the work of the Schei Committee. On 1 January 1963, Feda municipality was dissolved and it was merged with Kvinesdal municipality (in 1917 Liknes was renamed Kvinesdal) and Fjotland to create a new, larger municipality of Kvinesdal. Prior to the merger, Feda had 576 inhabitants.

Name
The municipality (originally the parish) is named after the old "Fede" farm. The name of the farm comes from the name of the river Fedaelva which flows into the Fedafjorden near the farm.

Government
All municipalities in Norway, including Feda, are responsible for primary education (through 10th grade), outpatient health services, senior citizen services, unemployment and other social services, zoning, economic development, and municipal roads.  The municipality was governed by a municipal council of elected representatives, which in turn elected a mayor.

Municipal council
The municipal council  of Feda was made up of representatives that were elected to four year terms.  The party breakdown of the final municipal council was as follows:

See also
List of former municipalities of Norway

References

Kvinesdal
Former municipalities of Norway
1900 establishments in Norway
1963 disestablishments in Norway